Kherka Gujjar is a village in Bahadurgarh Tehsil in Jhajjar District of Haryana, India. It is located 15 km towards East from District headquarters Jhajjar. 17 km from Bahadurgarh. 272 km from State capital Chandigarh. Its Pin code is 124507 and postal head office is Bahadurgarh.

References

Villages in Jhajjar district